Red Dress Day, or Red Dress Campaign, is an annual event held by the REDress Project in memory of the lives of Missing and Murdered Indigenous Women and Girls across Canada. This event was originally held on May 5, 2010, and continues annually. The event is sometimes held on other dates throughout the year to coincide with other days of action, such as National Indigenous Peoples Day. Associated names with this event include National Day of Awareness For Missing and Murdered Indigenous Women And Girls. Red Dress Day is one of several campaigns started by activists to call attention to disproportionate rates of violence against Indigenous women.

Background 
Inspired by the work of Métis artist Jaime Black that would go on to spark the REDress Project, this day draws attention to the more than 1,000 Missing and Murdered Indigenous Women and Girls (MMIWG) in Canada. The project was started in 2010 after Black displayed an installation at the University of Winnipeg that included a series of empty red dresses to honour and symbolize the lost lives of Indigenous women at the hands of violence. On this day, participants are encouraged to display empty red dresses in public spaces or wear red dresses to show support for the lives of MMIWG. Additional activities taking place on this day include also marches, memorials, and walks across Canada. Installations of red dresses are displayed in museums, university campuses, and exhibits.  The origins of this day began with the Walking With Our Sisters – K’omoks where a public memorial art installation had taken place in honour of Missing and Murdered Indigenous Women.

May 5th was the birthday of Lisa Marie Young, a 21-year-old Tla-o-qui-aht woman who disappeared under suspicious circumstances from Nanaimo, BC on Canada Day 2002. Despite hundreds of tips from the public, RCMP investigators have made no progress in the case.

In 2016, the first the Red Dress Awareness Campaign and Installation were organised and generated higher volumes of public attention on a national scale in both Canada and the United States. Although the REDress Project was not created as a call for a National Inquiry into Missing  and Murdered Indigenous Women and Girls, many supporters of the project and subsequent REDress Day are in favour of such an investigation, and used the event to put pressure on the Canadian government.

Legacy

Alberta 
Staff from the Awo Taan Native Healing Lodge, a shelter for Indigenous women and children in Calgary, Alberta, organized a local Red Dress Day event on November 19, 2019 at Calgary’s Central Library. Attendees of the event had the chance to learn more about Missing and Murdered Indigenous Women and Girls, and were also invited to make a small felt doll wearing a red dress, inspired by the original project’s installation of red dresses.

Ontario 
Students at Cardinal Leger Secondary School, in Brampton, Ontario, paid tribute to Missing and Murdered Indigenous Women and Girls on May 3, 2017, during an event inspired by Red Dress Day. The students wrote names taken from the Missing and Murdered Indigenous Women and Girls list on approximately 1,200 red feathers, which were then placed in trees near the school.

See Also 
 Am I Next
 Walking With Our Sisters
 Idle No More
 Sisters in Spirit

References 

2010 establishments in Canada
Remembrance days
Missing and Murdered Indigenous Women and Girls movement